Galphay (traditionally pronounced [ˈgɔ:fə] )  is a village in North Yorkshire, England. It is situated in the Nidderdale Area of Outstanding Natural Beauty (AONB).

A large central green is used for village events and has a flagstaff, village seat and a number of trees. The pub, The Galphay Inn is open Tuesdays to Sundays. The village has no church, shops or other public buildings and the Red Phone Box is also under threat of closure.

The name is derived from the Old English galga 'gallows' and haga 'enclosure', and thus means 'gallows enclosure'.  The earliest documentation about Galphay records that it was owned by Fountains Abbey in 1189.

Galphay now has around 60 houses, with a population of about 200.  In the last 100 years, a village school was opened; and subsequently closed.  The same fate awaited the Methodist Chapel, which is now a private house. A 'Village Institute', which was established after the First World War, is still in existence; housed in wooden structure originally used to house troops in training camp.

Galphay was historically a hamlet in the township of Azerley in the large ancient parish of Kirkby Malzeard in the West Riding of Yorkshire.  It became part of the civil parish of Azerley in 1866, and has now grown larger than the village of Azerley.  In 1974 it was transferred to the new county of North Yorkshire.

References

External links

 Galphay Village Website
Azerley Parish Council website
 History of Galphay - text of a talk given to Galphay Women's Institute in 1959
 Robert Welles of Galphay c.1516-1584/5 and others, with associated Vyner Deeds

Villages in North Yorkshire